The 2009–10 Illinois Fighting Illini women's basketball team will represent the University of Illinois in the 2009–10 NCAA Division I women's basketball season. It will be the 36th year of Illinois women's basketball. The Fighting Illini are a member of the Big 10 and will attempt to win their second Big Ten Championship and the NCAA championship.

Offseason
June 29: The University of Illinois Division of Intercollegiate Athletics marketing and promotions department recently placed first in the Single-Day Attendance Promotion. This was awarded by the National Association of Collegiate Marketing Administrators (NACMA) for the 2008-09 season. The award was for the World's Biggest Basketball Practice promotion, held at Memorial Stadium on Oct. 11, 2008 following the Fighting Illini's sold-out football game against Minnesota.

At the event, the Illinois men's and women's basketball teams held their first practice of the season immediately following the football game on a specially constructed outdoor court in the stadium's South end zone. Over 60,000 fans witnessed the practice, which also helped raise more than $20,000 for Coaches vs. Cancer. The World's Biggest Basketball Practice marked the largest crowd ever for a men's basketball practice and is the highest attendance to witness any women's basketball event. This honor marks the third year in a row that the Illinois marketing department has been awarded gold by NACMA for a Single-Day Attendance promotion.
July 2: Lisa Cermignano was hired as an assistant coach. Cermignano has 11 years of Division I coaching experience, including the last three as an assistant at Vanderbilt University. She fills the vacancy on Law's staff left by Karen Middleton, who recently became the head coach at Western Carolina University. Cermignano served as the team's defensive coordinator, and was part of Vanderbilt's recruiting efforts. In three seasons at VU, she helped lead the Commodores to three NCAA Tournament appearances, including two Sweet 16s (2008 and '09), and two Southeastern Conference (SEC) tournament titles (2007 and '09).
July 29: University of Illinois incoming freshman Destiny Williams has helped lead Team USA to a berth in the quarterfinals at the 2009 FIBA Women's U19 World Championships in Bangkok.
July 30: The Women's Basketball Coaches Association (WBCA), on behalf of the Wade Coalition, announced the 2009-2010 preseason "Wade Watch" list for The State Farm Wade Trophy Division I Player of the Year. University of Illinois senior Jenna Smith is one of 25 named to the list, which is made up of top NCAA Division I student-athletes who best embody the spirit of Lily Margaret Wade. This is based on the following criteria: game and season statistics, leadership, character, effect on their team and overall playing ability.
August 21: The 2009-10 preseason candidates list for the Women’s Wooden Award was released, naming 31 student athletes. Jenna Smith from Illinois was one of the candidates.

Exhibition

Regular season
The Fighting Illini will compete in the Cal Poly Holiday Beach Classic on November 28 and 29.

Roster
Jenna Smith was an all Big 10 selection the previous two seasons. Destiny Williams transferred to Baylor on January 20. The six incoming freshmen are ranked as the No. 3 recruiting class by ESPN HoopGurlz. Destiny Williams is a McDonald’s All-American.

Schedule

Player stats

Postseason

Big Ten tournament

NCAA Basketball tournament

Awards and honors

Preseason All-Big Ten Coaches Team
JENNA SMITH, Sr., F, ILL

Preseason All-Big Ten Media Team
Jenna Smith, Sr., F, ILL

Team players drafted into the WNBA

See also
2009–10 Big Ten women's basketball season
2009–10 Illinois Fighting Illini men's basketball team

References

External links
Official Site

Illinois Fighting Illini women's basketball seasons
Illinois
Illinois
Illinois